Uljua Reservoir is a medium-sized lake in the Siikajoki main catchment area. It is located in the region Northern Ostrobothnia. The reservoir is located at the village of Pulkkila, in Siikalatva municipality.

See also
List of lakes in Finland

References

Reservoirs in Finland
Lakes of Siikalatva